She Always Gets Their Man is a 1962 British comedy film directed by Godfrey Grayson and starring Sally Smith and William Fox.

Plot
The ladies of the Kensington Residential Club For Women have a problem  when Betty's (Ann Sears) country cousin comes to stay. Beautiful blonde Sally (Sally Smith) is an instant hit with all the men, much to the annoyance of Betty and her friends. In a desperate attempt to distract gold digging Sally from stealing their boyfriends, the women hire an actor (William Fox) to pose as a millionaire to woo her. However when the actor begins to take his role rather too seriously, Betty and her friends must put an end to the charade.

Cast
Sally Smith as Sally
Terence Alexander as Bob Conley
Ann Sears as Betty Tate
William Fox as Waling
Avril Elgar as Sylvia
Benice Swanson as May
Gale Sheridan as Phyllis
Michael Balfour as Runkle
Ian Curry as Hal
John Brooking as Sir Basil
Sandra Alfred as Naomi
Graham Curnow as Jack
Paul Craig as Joe
Annette Kerr as Clara
Malcolm Knight as George

References

External links

1962 films
British comedy films
1962 comedy films
British black-and-white films
1960s English-language films
1960s British films